Sphinx is a genus of moths in the family Sphingidae. The genus was erected by Carl Linnaeus in his 1758 10th edition of Systema Naturae.

Species

Sphinx adumbrata (Dyar, 1912)
Sphinx asellus (Rothschild & Jordan, 1903)
Sphinx caligineus (Butler, 1877)
Sphinx canadensis (Boisduval, 1875)
Sphinx centrosinaria Kitching & Jin, 1998
Sphinx chersis (Hubner, 1823)
Sphinx chisoya (Schaus, 1932)
Sphinx constricta Butler, 1885
Sphinx crassistriga (Rothschild & Jordan, 1903)
Sphinx dollii Neumoegen, 1881
Sphinx drupiferarum JE Smith, 1797
Sphinx formosana Riotte, 1970
Sphinx franckii Neumoegen, 1893
Sphinx gordius Cramer, 1779
Sphinx kalmiae JE Smith, 1797
Sphinx leucophaeata Clemens, 1859
Sphinx libocedrus Edwards, 1881
Sphinx ligustri Linnaeus, 1758
Sphinx luscitiosa Clemens, 1859
Sphinx maurorum (Jordan, 1931)
Sphinx morio (Rothschild & Jordan, 1903)
Sphinx nogueirai Haxaire, 2002
Sphinx oberthueri (Rothschild & Jordan, 1903)
Sphinx perelegans Edwards, 1874
Sphinx pinastri Linnaeus, 1758
Sphinx poecila Stephens, 1828
Sphinx sequoiae Boisduval, 1868
Sphinx vashti Strecker, 1878

Gallery

References

 
Sphingini
Insects of Turkey
Moth genera
Taxa named by Carl Linnaeus